Joe Strummer: The Future Is Unwritten is a 2007 documentary film directed by Julien Temple about Joe Strummer, the lead singer of the British punk rock band The Clash, that went on to win the British Independent Film Awards as Best British Documentary 2007. The film premiered 20 January 2007 at the 2007 Sundance Film Festival. It was also shown at the Dublin Film Festival on 24 February 2007.

It was released in the United Kingdom on 18 May 2007 and in Australia on 31 August 2007. The film opened in limited release in the United States on 2 November 2007.

Cast
Brigitte Bardot – Herself (archive footage)
Michael Balzary (Flea) – Himself
Bono – Himself
Steve Buscemi – Himself
Terry Chimes – Himself
John Cooper Clarke – Himself
John Cusack – Himself
Peter Cushing – Winston Smith (archive footage)
Johnny Depp – Himself
Matt Dillon – Himself
Tymon Dogg – Himself (archive footage)
Joe Ely – Himself
Antony Genn – Himself
Bobby Gillespie – Himself
Alasdair Gillies – Himself
Iain Gillies – Himself
Bob Gruen – Himself
Topper Headon – Himself
Damien Hirst – Himself
Mick Jagger – Himself (archive footage)
Jim Jarmusch – Himself
Mick Jones – Himself
Steve Jones – Himself
Anthony Kiedis – Himself
Don Letts – Himself
Keith Levene – Himself
Courtney Love – Herself
Bernie Rhodes – Himself
David Lee Roth – Himself (archive footage)
Martin Scorsese – Himself
Joe Strummer – Himself

Special Thanks: Terence Dackombe

Critical reception
The film was well received by critics.  As of 18 October 2009 on the review aggregator Rotten Tomatoes, 89% of critics gave the film positive reviews, based on 61 reviews. On Metacritic, the film had an average score of 79 out of 100, based on 19 reviews.

Marc Savlov of The Austin Chronicle named it the 8th best film of 2007. Stephanie Zacharek of Salon named it the 9th best film of 2007.

Box office performance
As of 31 January 2008 box office takings totalled $US 1,108,740.

Awards
 Nominated Grand Jury Prize in the World Cinema – Documentary category at the 2007 Sundance Film Festival
 Winner of Best British Documentary at the 2007 British Independent Film Awards
 Nominated Best Single Documentary at the 2008 Irish Film and Television Awards

Soundtrack
The official soundtrack was produced by Ian Neil, Julien Temple, and Alan Moloney. It is a mix of spoken word clips from interviews with Strummer and others, tracks from his various bands (including several rare or unreleased tracks by The Clash), and eclectic selections from other musicians that Strummer played on his BBC World radio show London Calling from 1999-2002 (some of which include his spoken introduction).

References

External links

2007 films
British documentary films
The Clash
Films directed by Julien Temple
Rockumentaries
Documentary films about punk music and musicians
2000s English-language films
2000s British films